Duvindu Tillakaratne (born 9 September 1996) is a Sri Lankan cricketer. He is the son of Sri Lankan Test cricketer Hashan Tillakaratne, and the twin brother of Ravindu Tillakaratne.

He made his first-class debut for Badureliya Sports Club in the 2016–17 Premier League Tournament on 9 December 2016. He made his List A debut for Ampara District in the 2016–17 Districts One Day Tournament on 15 March 2017.

He was the leading wicket-taker for Burgher Recreation Club in the 2018–19 Premier League Tournament, with 34 dismissals in nine matches. In November 2019, he was named in Sri Lanka's squad for the men's cricket tournament at the 2019 South Asian Games. The Sri Lanka team won the silver medal, after they lost to Bangladesh by seven wickets in the final. He was the leading wicket-taker in the 2019–20 Premier League Tournament, with 61 dismissals in nine matches.

In October 2020, he was drafted by the Galle Gladiators for the inaugural edition of the Lanka Premier League.

He was the leading wicket taker in the 2022 major clubs limited over tournament with 36 wickets in 12 matches.

References

External links
 

1996 births
Living people
Sri Lankan cricketers
Ampara District cricketers
Badureliya Sports Club cricketers
Burgher Recreation Club cricketers
Cricketers from Colombo
South Asian Games silver medalists for Sri Lanka
South Asian Games medalists in cricket